Pope James of Alexandria was the 50th Pope of Alexandria and Patriarch of the See of St. Mark.

Pope Jacob ordained Abuna Yohannes as the head of the Ethiopian Orthodox Church, according to the History of the Patriarchs of Alexandria; however, civil war, drought, and plague in Ethiopia forced Yohannes to return to Alexandria, where he remained through Pope James' tenure.

9th-century Coptic Orthodox popes of Alexandria